Arouca/Maloney is a parliamentary electoral district in Trinidad and Tobago in the centre of Trinidad. It has been represented since 2015 by Camille Robinson-Regis of the People's National Movement.

Constituency profile 
The constituency was created prior to the 2007 Trinidad and Tobago general election by combining seventeen polling divisions from the former Arouca South constituency with two polling divisions from St. Augustine. It borders Lopinot/Bon Air West, St. Augustine, and D'Abadie/O'Meara. The main towns are Arouca, Maloney, Red-Hill, Trincity and portions of Tacarigua. It had an electorate of 26,321 as of 2015. It is considered a safe seat for the People's National Movement.

Members of Parliament 
This constituency has elected the following members of the House of Representatives of Trinidad and Tobago:

Election results

Elections in the 2020s

Elections in the 2010s

References 

Constituencies of the Parliament of Trinidad and Tobago